
This is a list of bridges documented by the Historic American Engineering Record in the U.S. state of North Carolina.

Bridges

References

External links

List
List
North Carolina
Bridges, HAER
Bridges, HAER